125 may refer to:
125 (number), a natural number
AD 125, a year in the 2nd century AD
125 BC, a year in the 2nd century BC
125 (dinghy)
125 (New Jersey bus)

See also
 12/5 (disambiguation)
 Unbipentium, a hypothetical chemical element with atomic number 125